No Other Love is a Chinese film. Vicky Zhao Wei is the director. Max Film is the production company and the funders are various Chinese companies, including Alibaba Pictures Group.

 of Leon Dai, a Taiwanese actor, after outcry among the Communist Youth League, even though his filming was already completed. The internet commenters accused Dai of supporting Taiwanese independence and the funders stated they were unhappy with his response to the inquiries.

References

External links
 

Upcoming films
Chinese drama films
2016 controversies